Zdeněk Konečný (born 13 August 1936) is a Czech basketball player. He competed in the men's tournament at the 1960 Summer Olympics.

References

External links
Brno sport stars Miroslav Čada and Zdeněk Konečný

1936 births
Living people
Czech men's basketball players
Olympic basketball players of Czechoslovakia
Basketball players at the 1960 Summer Olympics
Sportspeople from Olomouc